Gracies Dinnertime Theatre (GDT) was a publication written by a group of Rochester Institute of Technology (RIT) students that was in production from 1995 to 2005.  In its 257 issues, it was notorious for its political incorrectness regarding topics such as race relations, bizarre end-time prophecies, baseless conspiracy theories, provocation of the established student magazine, Reporter, the Clinton and Bush administrations and in particular, RIT President Al Simone.

Perhaps GDTs greatest single contribution was the article "The Politics of High Tech Damnation," which examined the close, covert links between the CIA and RIT in the early and mid 1990s.

Less controversial content included a weekly chess puzzle and frank sexual discussion.

GDTs presence on the internet initially began as a text-only finger plan. By the fall of 1995, GDT had a web site hosted by one of its creators, making it one of the first student satire publications to have a web presence. In time, the hosting of the web site migrated to servers owned by RIT Computer Science House. Its final resting place came to be on the Hell's Kitchen server.

GDT spawned five sister publications which all published under the combined title of Hell's Kitchen.  This was distributed for free on four universities in Rochester, NY and Rutgers University.  Under this combined title, GDT received notable attention from the Independent Press Association, Rochester's daily newspaper The Democrat and Chronicle, and had a few articles reproduced via UWIRE.

History

Publication's logo 
The logo for GDT was created before GDT existed. The shape of the logo was derived from what it looked like when the three founders of the publication stood shoulder-to-shoulder—in order of increasing height—and placed a meter stick on their heads.

Rumors Regarding the "Unity" Sculpture

A sculpture entitled "Unity" was installed in the quad between the College of Imaging Arts and Sciences, the College of Applied Science and Technology, and the College of Engineering in 2008. Designed as a collaboration between the RIT faculty members Juan Carlos Caballero-Perez and Leonard Urso, the sculpture is visually similar to the logo used by GDT from 2000 to 2005 and has led to speculation that it was inspired by GDT.

Juan Carlos Caballero-Perez taught at RIT as an adjunct professor in the School of American Crafts within the College of Imaging Arts and Sciences(CIAS) starting in 1994—the year GDT began publishing on the RIT campus. At the time of its founding, two of the original three co-editors were in programs within CIAS, and GDT was involved in protests related to proposed budget cuts to the School of American Crafts and School of Art and Design in April 1996. GDT would later go on to publish a piece that examined the close connections between CIAS and the actual CIA.

Intentional misspellings in title 

 "Gracies" would appear to be a possessive pronoun referring to RIT's Grace Watson Dining Hall (colloquially "Gracie's"). Used without the apostrophe, "Gracies" may be read as plural, suggesting a multiverse of parallel dining halls.
 "Dinnertime Theatre" may recall a formal Dinner theater production, or it may simply denote theatre that occurs coincidental to meal without the willing participation of the diners. Socialization based around the sharing of "food" (not only physical nutrition, but also information) was a recurring theme in GDT production culture. 
 "Theatre" uses the British English spelling; another frequently used affectation in GDT articles.

References

External links
 Archive of Gracies Dinnertime Theatre at RIT Libraries
 Unmasked image of the Unity sculpture
 Gracies Dinnertime Theatre homepage, with complete archive.
 Reproduction of Democrat and Chronicle article on Hell's Kitchen.
 Reproduction of Independent Press Association article on Hell's Kitchen.
 UWIRE affiliate list.
 Politics of High Tech Damnation, by Ali Zaidi .

Defunct newspapers published in New York (state)
Student newspapers published in New York (state)